The glutamate receptor, metabotropic 1, also known as GRM1, is a human gene which encodes the metabotropic glutamate receptor 1 (mGluR1) protein.

Function 

L-glutamate is the major excitatory neurotransmitter in the central nervous system and activates both ionotropic and metabotropic glutamate receptors.  Glutamatergic neurotransmission is involved in most aspects of normal brain function and can be perturbed in many neuropathologic conditions. The metabotropic glutamate receptors are a family of G protein-coupled receptors, that have been divided into 3 groups on the basis of sequence homology, putative signal transduction mechanisms, and pharmacologic properties.  Group I, which includes GRM1 alongside GRM5, have been shown to activate phospholipase C.  Group II includes GRM2 and GRM3 while Group III includes GRM4, GRM6, GRM7 and GRM8.   Group II and III receptors are linked to the inhibition of the cyclic AMP cascade but differ in their agonist selectivities. Alternative splice variants of the GRM1 gene have been described but their full-length nature has not been determined.

A possible connection has been suggested between mGluRs and neuromodulators, as mGluR1 antagonists block adrenergic receptor activation in neurons.

Studies with knockout mice 

Mice lacking functional glutamate receptor 1 were reported in 1994. By homologous recombination mediated gene targeting those mice became deficient in mGlu receptor 1 protein. The mice did not show any basic anatomical changes in the brain but had impaired cerebellar long-term depression and hippocampal long-term potentiation. In addition they had impaired motor functions, characterized by impaired balance. In the Morris watermaze test, an assay for learning abilities, those mice needed significantly more time to successfully complete the task.

Clinical significance 

Mutations in the GRM1 gene may contribute to melanoma susceptibility. Antibodies against mGluR1 receptors cause cerebellar ataxia and impair long-term depression (LTDpathies) in the cerebellum.

Ligands
In addition to the orthosteric  site (the site where the endogenous ligand glutamate binds) at least two distinct allosteric binding sites exist on the mGluR1. A respectable number of potent and specific allosteric ligands – predominantly antagonists/inhibitors – has been developed in recent years, although no orthosteric subtype-selective ligands have yet been discovered (2008).

 JNJ-16259685: highly potent, selective non-competitive antagonist
 R-214,127 and [3H]-analog: high-affinity,  selective allosteric inhibitor
 YM-202,074: high-affinity, selective allosteric antagonist
 YM-230,888: high-affinity, selective allosteric antagonist
 YM-298,198 and [3H]-analog: selective non-competitive antagonist
 FTIDC:  highly potent and selective allosteric antagonist/inverse agonist
 A-841,720: potent non-competitive antagonist; minor hmGluR5 binding
 VU-71: potentiator
 Fluorinated 9H-xanthene-9-carboxylic acid oxazol-2-yl-amides: orally available PAMs
 Cyclothiazide: non-selective non-competitive antagonist

See also 
 Metabotropic glutamate receptor

References

Further reading

External links 

 

Metabotropic glutamate receptors